Scolopostethus pictus is a species of dirt-colored seed bug in the family Rhyparochromidae, found in Europe and western Asia.

Subspecies
These three subspecies belong to the species Scolopostethus pictus:
 Scolopostethus pictus antennalis Horvath, 1882
 Scolopostethus pictus pictus (Schilling, 1829)
 Scolopostethus pictus testaceus Roubal, 1958

References

External links

 

Rhyparochromidae